Cornell is an unincorporated community in the Santa Monica Mountains, within western Los Angeles County, California.

Geography
Cornell is a unique, picturesque neighborhood of homes along the scenic Mulholland Highway Corridor and in the rural mountain area near Malibou Lake  It is largely surrounded by open space parks within the NPS Santa Monica Mountains National Recreation Area, including Paramount Ranch and Peter Strauss Ranch parks. The former Paramount Studios property was a movie ranch, still with 'Old Western' sets used in filming movies and television series. Cornell is notable for its "tall trees" atmosphere among old-growth oak and pine, and for the many peacocks that roam the neighborhoods, and perch on residents' rooftops and balconies.  Many homeowners have acreage and stables with horses, and ride on the numerous horse and hiking trails into the surrounding parklands.

Cornell is located between Agoura Hills and Malibu. It can be reached most easily via Kanan Dume Road, from either the Pacific Coast Highway southwest in Malibu, or the Ventura Freeway (101) northeast in Agoura Hills.

Cable TV and refuse pickup are served from Malibu; while their water and electricity are served from Agoura Hills.  The town uses the Agoura Hills ZIP Code 91301.

Features
A post office operated at Cornell from 1884 to 1904.  The former post office was later turned into The Old Place Restaurant and was frequented by Steve McQueen, Ali MacGraw and Jason Robards in the late 1960s.

The Tour of California bicycle race passes through Cornell on Mulholland Highway.

See also

References

Unincorporated communities in Los Angeles County, California
Populated places in the Santa Monica Mountains
Mulholland Highway
Populated places established in 1884
1884 establishments in California
Unincorporated communities in California